The Poronay is the longest river on the island of Sakhalin in Russia. It flows in a southerly direction through Tym, Smirnykhovsky and Poronaysky Districts.

Geography
The two branches create a marshy river island in the middle. The town of Poronaysk is located near the western mouth of the river.

The Poronay is crossed by only two bridges, one rail and one road bridge. Both bridges are next to each other, in the middle of the river between the towns of Pobedino and Pervomaysk. The river valley, especially the area between the downstream Poronay and the Deer River (a small river to the east), has many lakes. The Poronay river system is a rich breeding ground for salmon and other anadromous fish, as well as freshwater fish such as Amur pike.

Hydrology

The river is fed by both snowmelt and rain. Average water flow is 120 m³/s. The highest level of flow has been observed in early May, and the lowest in the second half of September. The river usually freezes in the second half of November, while the ice thaws in late April.

List of tributaries
The length of each tributary is given in parentheses:
Right tributaries
Leonidovka (95)
Orlovka (83)
Onorka (77)
Kamenka (Nizhnyaya Matrosovka) (71)
Buyuklinka (63)
Yelnaya (61)
Longari (55 )
Severnaya Khandasa (54)
Yuzhnaya Khandasa (51)
Pobedinka (49)
Taulan (41)
Tumannaya (34)
Daldaganka (31)
Tayozhnaya (31)
Left tributaries
Zhitnitsa (Muyka) (61)
Valza (50)
Borisovka (38)
Kresty (36)

References

Rivers of Sakhalin Oblast
Drainage basins of the Sea of Okhotsk